Febres is a civil parish in the municipality of Cantanhede, Portugal. The population in 2011 was 3,352, in an area of 22.94 km².

References

Freguesias of Cantanhede, Portugal